The Scottish Rite Cathedral of San Antonio, Texas is located at 308 Avenue E in San Antonio.  Construction began on it in 1922 and was completed in 1924, at a cost of $1.5 million.

It is a 5.5-story building in the style of a classic revival temple, and serves as a headquarters and meeting place for Scottish Rite Masonry in San Antonio, and for the South Texas Region. The building also frequently serves as an event hall for performing arts and various cultural events.

The building features notable architectural elements including: gabled front portico, Corinthian columns, a terracotta frieze, and elaborately sculpted bronze front doors featuring George Washington and Sam Houston which were created by Pompeo Coppini. Coppini was a thirty-second degree member of the San Antonio Consistory.  In 1936, sculptor Coppini was one of the honored guests who delivered an address at the November 15 dedication and installation of the doors.

The cathedral was listed on the National Register of Historic Places in 1996.

References

Clubhouses on the National Register of Historic Places in Texas
Masonic buildings completed in 1924
Masonic buildings in Texas
National Register of Historic Places in San Antonio
Neoclassical architecture in Texas
Sculptures by Pompeo Coppini